The Claremont-Mudd-Scripps men's basketball program was established in 1958. CMS teams coached by Ken Scalmanini have won 9 conference titles in 18 seasons, including 4 straight from 2009 to 2013.  Former coach David Wells led CMS to their first NCAA Tournament victory in 1996. The CMS program comprises students from Claremont McKenna College, Harvey Mudd College and Scripps College, and participates in Division III (NCAA) for the Southern California Intercollegiate Athletic Conference (SCIAC).

Season-by-season results

Postseason results

NCAA tournament results
The Stags have appeared in the NCAA Division III Tournament 14 times. Their combined record is 4–14.

Awards

SCIAC Player of the Year (since 1981)

SCIAC Coach of the Year (since 2015)

References